Rudolph Edmund Aloysius Feilding, Viscount Feilding  (12 October 1885 – 9 January 1937) was a British soldier and businessman.

Early life 
Rudolpg Feilding was the son of Rudolph Robert Basil Aloysius Augustine Feilding, 9th Earl of Denbigh, and the Hon. Cecilia Mary Clifford. He was styled as Viscount Feilding between 1892 and 1937. He was educated at The Oratory School Edgbaston and Christ Church Oxford from where he graduated in 1907.

In 1911 he married Agnes Imelda Mary Harding, of Old Springs, Market Drayton.

He was the brother of Lady Dorothie Feilding MM.

Military service 
Feilding served with the British Army as an officer before retiring to the Special Reserve.

First World War 

Rejoining the army with the outbreak of the First World War, Feilding sailed for France with the Coldstream Guards. It was in this early phase of the war that he earned the Distinguished Service Cross for his gallantry in leading his platoon on 21 October 1914.

He led his platoon in an attack, held the position gained for two days under heavy artillery fire and prepared defensive positions.

Later he rose to the rank of major and then lieutenant-colonel, was mentioned in dispatches and was made CMG in 1918.

He was decorated with the Legion of Honour, Companion Order of St Michael and St George.

Later life 
Following his wartime service, Feilding moved into business. He took the directorship of companies including British Plaster Board Ltd, Sea Insurance Company Ltd and Vitamins Ltd.

He died at his home, Newnham Paddox near Rugby after suffering from influenza at the age of 51.

Feilding had five sons, the eldest of whom, the Hon. William Rudolph Stephen Feilding, succeeded him in his title.

He was Justice of the Peace for Warwickshire.

References

External links 
 Lieutenant Rudolph Edmund Aloysius Feilding CMG DSO (Imperial War Museum photographs)

1885 births
Alumni of Christ Church, Oxford
Coldstream Guards officers
1937 deaths
British courtesy viscounts
Heirs apparent who never acceded
English justices of the peace
British Army personnel of World War II
Companions of the Distinguished Service Order
Companions of the Order of St Michael and St George
Deaths from influenza
Infectious disease deaths in England
20th-century English businesspeople